Kalanchoe suarezensis is a species of Kalanchoe (section Bryophyllum) native to northern Madagascar.

It is cultivated as ornamental plants, but often misidentified as other species like K. gastonis-bonnieri, K. mortagei and K. poincarei. K. gastonis-bonnieri differs by more or less having brownish spots on leaves, while the leaves of K. suarezensis are spotless. K. mortagei differs by having auriculate to peltate leaves, while the leaf base of K. suarezensis is attenuate to truncate. K. poincarei is a sprawling species not known in cultivation, very different from all the species mentioned above.

Another species that may be confused with K. suarezensis is K. laetivirens. Both species have spotless leaves, but K. suarezensis have plantlets usually near the leaf tip, while K. laetivirens have plantlets all along the leaf margin.

Gallery

References 

suarezensis
suarezense
Endemic flora of Madagascar
Taxa named by Joseph Marie Henry Alfred Perrier de la Bâthie